1st Transportation Battalion (TB) is a General Support (GS) logistics unit of the United States Marine Corps that is headquartered at Marine Corps Base Camp Pendleton, California.  The unit falls under the command of Combat Logistics Regiment 1 and the 1st Marine Logistics Group.

Mission
Provide transportation and throughput support for the Marine Expeditionary Force (MEF) to facilitate the distribution of personnel, equipment, and supplies by air, ground, and sea.

Subordinate units
 Headquarters & Service Company
 Motor Transport Company A
Motor Transport Company B

History

Korean War
The 7th Motor Transport Battalion was activated at the outset of the Korean War on August 5, 1950 at Marine Corps Base Camp Pendleton, California. That same month the battalion departed the West Coast for Kobe, Japan where it staged for follow on tasking.  On September 15, 1950, 7th Motor Transport Battalion began to come ashore during the Battle of Inchon. The battalion remained in support of the 1st Marine Division for the remainder of the war and took part in the Battle of Chosin Reservoir, fighting on the East-Central Front and action on the Western Front.

Inter-war years

After the Korean Armistice Agreement was signed the battalion remained in Korea until March 1955 when it was relocated back to MCB Camp Pendleton, CA.  The battalion was reassigned to the 1st Marine Division in October 1955 and continued to train in the Southwestern United States for the next decade.

Vietnam War
7th Motor Transport Battalion landed in South Vietnam in March 1966.  During its time in Vietnam the battalion supported combat operations near Da Nang, Chu Lai and Quảng Trị.  7th Motor Transport Battalion departed South Vietnam in February 1970.  Arriving back at MCB Camp Pendleton in March 1970 the battalion was initially assigned to the 5th Marine Expeditionary Brigade.  The battalion was again assigned to the 1st Marine Division in April 1971 only to be deactivated the next month on May 7, 1971.

1970s - 1990s
7th Motor Transport Battalion was reactivated on March 30, 1976 at MCB Camp Pendleton, CA as part of the 1st Force Service Support Group (1st FSSG).  The battalion deployed to Saudi Arabia in December 1990.  It supported combat operations during the Gulf War and returned to the United States is April 1991. In December 1992, 7th Motor Transport Battalion was part of the Unified Task Force sent to Somalia to conduct humanitarian assistance.  The battalion departed Somalia in February 1993.  Elements of 7th Motor-T next participated in Operation Vigilant Warrior in Kuwait in response to build up of Iraqi Republican Guard forces on the border in 
October 1994.  The battalion was deactivated on December 8, 1998.

Reactivation and current operations
1st Transportation Support Battalion was reactivated at MCB Camp Pendleton, CA on October 1, 2014, as part of Combat Logistics Regiment 1 and the 1st Marine Logistics Group.

Redesignation 
On April 2, 2021 1st Transportation Support Battalion was redesignated as 1st Transportation Battalion. The redesignation of 1st Transportation Support Battalion to 1st Transportation Battalion and deactivation of Landing Support Company and Support Company were modernization initiatives conducted to best align the United States Marine Corps to support the National Defense Strategy.

Unit awards
A unit citation or commendation is an award bestowed upon an organization for the action cited. Members of the unit who participated in said actions are allowed to wear on their uniforms the awarded unit citation. 1st TSB has been presented with the following awards:
.

See also
 List of United States Marine Corps battalions
 Organization of the United States Marine Corps

References

External links
 1st TB's official website

Logistics battalions of the United States Marine Corps